The 1973 Cincinnati Bearcats football team represented the University of Cincinnati as an independent during 1973 NCAA Division I football season. Led by first-year head coach Tony Mason, the Bearcats compiled a record of 4–7.

Schedule

References

Game films
 1973 Cincinnati - Miami (Oh) Football Game Film, Reel 1
 1973 Cincinnati - Miami (Oh) Football Game Film, Reel 2
 1973 Cincinnati - Miami (Oh) Football Game Film, Reel 3
 1973 Cincinnati - Miami (Oh) Football Game Film, Reel 4

Cincinnati
Cincinnati Bearcats football seasons
Cincinnati Bearcats football